Coccothrinax ekmanii, also known in Haitian Creole as gwenn or in Dominican Spanish as palma de guano, is a palm which is endemic to the island of Hispaniola (in the Dominican Republic and Haiti).

Description
Like other members of the genus, C. ekmanii is a fan palm.  Trees are single-stemmed, between 3 and 15 metres tall with stems 5 to 8 (occasionally 20) centimetres in diameter.  The fruit is brownish, 5–6 millimetres in diameter.  It grows on rocky hills or in dry scrub forest on limestone.

References

ekmanii
Trees of Haiti
Trees of the Dominican Republic 
Data deficient plants
Plants described in 1929
Taxa named by Max Burret